The Tonna is a stream in the Thuringian Basin, Germany.

See also
List of rivers of Thuringia

References

Rivers of Thuringia
Rivers of Germany